The Ethiopian Cup is the top knockout tournament of the Ethiopian football. It was created in 1945.

Winners
1945 : British Military Mission-BMME (Addis Abeba)
1946 : Army (Addis Abeba)
1947 : Polisportiva (Addis Abeba)
1948 : Body Guard (Addis Abeba)
1949 : Army (Addis Abeba)
1950 : Army (Addis Abeba)
1951 : Army (Addis Abeba)
1952 : Saint-George SA (Addis Abeba)
1953 : Saint-George SA (Addis Abeba)
1954 : Army (Addis Abeba)
1955 : Mechal (Addis Abeba)
1956 : Mechal (Addis Abeba)
1957 : Saint-George SA (Addis Abeba)
1958 : Mekuria (Addis Abeba)
1959 : Omedla (Addis Abeba) (Police)
1960 : Nib (Bishoftu) (Air Force)
no Cup between 1961 and 1969
1970 : Asmara (Asmara)
1971 : EEPCO (Addis Abeba)
1972 : EEPCO (Addis Abeba)
1973 : Saint-George SA (Addis Abeba)
1974 : Saint-George SA (Addis Abeba)
1975 : Mechal (Addis Abeba)
1976 : EEPCO (Addis Abeba)
1977 : Saint-George SA (Addis Abeba)
1978 : Omedla (Addis Abeba)
1979 : no cup
1980 : Ermejachen (Addis Abeba)
1981 : Key Bahr "Red Sea" (Eritrea)
1982 : Mechal (Addis Abeba)
1983 : Key Bahr "Red Sea" (Eritrea)
1984 : Eritrea Shoes (Eritrea)
1985 : Eritrea Shoes (Eritrea)
1986 : Building Construction (Addis Abeba)
1987 : Eritrea Shoes (Eritrea)
1988 : Bunna Gebeya
1989 : no cup
1990 : Mechal (Addis Abeba)
No Cup between 1991 and 1992
1993 : Saint-George SA (Addis Abeba)
1994 : Muger Cement (Adama)
1995 : Medhin (Addis Abeba) (Insurance)
1996 : Awassa Flour Mill (Awassa)
1997 : Wolaita Tussa S.C. (Wolaita Sodo)
1998 : Ethiopian Coffee (Addis Abeba) 4-2 (a.p.) Saint-George SA (Addis Abeba)
1999 : Saint-George SA (Addis Abeba)
2000 : Ethiopian Coffee (Addis Abeba) 2-1 Awassa Kenema (Awassa)
2001 : EEPCO (Addis Abeba) 2-1 (a.p.) Guna Trading FC (Mekelé)
2002 : Medhin (Addis Abeba) 0 - 0 (6 - 3) EEPCO (Addis Abeba)
2003 : Ethiopian Coffee (Addis Abeba) 2-0 EEPCO (Addis Abeba)
2004 : Banks SC (Addis Abeba) 1-0 Ethiopian Coffee (Addis Abeba)
2005 : Awassa Kenema (Awassa) 2-2 Muger Cement (Nazareth) (Awassa gagne aux tirs aux buts)
2006 : Mekelakeya (Addis Abeba) 1-0 Ethiopian Coffee (Addis Abeba)
2007 : Harrar Beer Botling F.C.
2008 : Ethiopian Coffee (Addis Abeba) 2-1 Awassa Kenema (Awassa)
2009-10 : Dedebit (Addis Abeba) 1-0 Saint-George SA (Addis Abeba)
2010-11 : Saint-George SA (Addis Abeba) 3-1 Muger Cement (Nazareth)
2012 : not played
2013 : Mekelakeya (Addis Abeba) 0-0 (4-2 pen.) Saint-George SA (Addis Abeba)
2014 : Dedebit
2015 : Mekelakeya (Addis Abeba) 2-0 Awassa Kenema (Awassa)
2016 : Saint-George SA (Addis Abeba) 1-1 (4-3 pen.) Mekelakeya (Addis Abeba)
2017 : Welayta Dicha (Sodo) 1-1 (4-3 pen.) Mekelakeya (Addis Abeba)
2018 : Mekelakeya (Addis Abeba) 0-0 (3-2 pen.) Saint-George SA (Addis Abeba)
2019 : Fasil Kenema (Gonder) 1-1 (pen.) Awassa Kenema (Awassa)
2020 :

References

External links
RSSSF.com

Football competitions in Ethiopia
National association football cups
Recurring sporting events established in 1945
1945 establishments in Ethiopia